The Catocalinae are a subfamily of noctuoid moths, placed in family Noctuidae.
In the alternative arrangement, where the Noctuidae are reduced to the core group around the Noctuinae, the present lineage is abolished, the upranked Catocalini being merged with the Erebini and becoming a subfamily of the reestablished family Erebidae.

Many of the species are large compared to other noctuids in temperate zones, and have brightly colored backwings.

The closely related Ophiderinae and Calpinae are sometimes merged into this group.

Genera 
The Catocalinae genera are usually assigned to the tribes Tytini, Armadini and Erebini, which have a fairly small number of genera, and the much larger Catocalini. The Poaphilini are another proposed tribe around the genus Argyrostrotis (= Poaphila), but is here considered to be paraphyletic. In addition, a high proportion of genera is not at present assigned to a specific tribe as their relationships require further study. These genera incertae sedis are:

  Acanthodelta
  Acanthodica
  Alapadna
  Allotria
  Alophosoma
  Amphiongia
  Anereuthina
  Anisoneura
  Anydrophila
  Argyrostrotis
  Arsacia
  Artena
  Arthisma
  Athyrma
  Attatha
  Attonda
  Axiocteta
  Bamra
  Batracharta
  Blasticorhinus
  Bocula
  Calesia
  Calliodes
  Celiptera
  Chalciope
  Chrysopera
  Coenipeta (Catocalini: Ophiusina?)
  Crioa
  Ctenusa
  Cutina
  Cyligramma
  Dasypodia
  Delgamma
 Dermaleipa (sometimes in Thyas)
  Dinumma
  Donuca
  Dordura
  Doryodes
  Ecphysis
  Egybolis
  Entomogramma
  Ercheia
  Erygia
  Eubolina (Catocalini: Ophiusina?)
  Euclystis (Catocalini: Ophiusina?)
  Euparthenos (Catocalini: Ophiusina?)
  Felinia
  Focillidia
  Gesonia
  Hamodes
  Hexamitoptera
  Homodes
  Hypopyra
  Iontha
  Ischyja
  Lacera
  Loxioda
  Lygniodes
  Matigramma (Catocalini: Ophiusina?)
  Metria (Catocalini: Ophiusina?)
  Mocis
  Niguza
  Ocalaria
  Ommatophora
  Pantydia
  Parallelia (Catocalini: Ophiusina?)
  Phoberia
  Phyllodes
  Platyja
  Plecoptera
  Pseudanthracia (Catocalini: Ophiusina?)
  Pseudoarcte
  Pseudosphetta
  Pterocyclophora
  Ptichodis
  Remigiodes
  Sciatta
  Scolecocampa
  Serrodes
  Speiredonia
  Spiloloma
  Spirama
  Sympis
  Tephriopis
  Thyas (Catocalini: Ophiusina?)
  Trigonodes
  Varicosia
  Zale (Catocalini: Ophiusina?)

In addition, some little-known noctuoid moth species which differ somewhat from the bulk of their supposed genera might belong here:
 Crypsiprora oxymetopa Turner, 1941
 Hypoprora tortuosa Turner, 1929
 Prorocopis acroleuca Turner, 1929
 Raparna trigramma Turner, 1906
 Sophta aeluropis Meyrick, 1902

Placement of Xenogenes in the Catocalinae is in error; it is a geometer moth, family Geometridae.

Footnotes

References

  (2011): Erebinae. Version 2.4, 2011-JAN-27. Retrieved 2011-DEC-27.
  (2011): Markku Savela's Lepidoptera and some other life forms: Catocalinae. Version of 2011-OCT-29. Retrieved 2011-DEC-27.

External links 
 R.A.R.E. France species.
 Catocalinae classification and pictures
 Photo gallery of Catocalinae
 Lepidoptera and some other life forms: Catocalinae. Retrieved 2006-JAN-11.